The Filter's TV personalisation products increase viewing, loyalty and revenue. Their data science underpins the business decisions of the world’s most forward thinking broadcasters. Founded in 2004, it has ties to musician Peter Gabriel and is based in Bath, UK. In March 2022, The Filter was acquired by the Amsterdam-headquartered end-to-end video streaming provider, 24i.

History
The idea behind The Filter was devised by musician Peter Gabriel and software entrepreneur Martin Hopkins. Gabriel foresaw that the growth of digital technologies would lead to such large volume of content becoming available that users would need filters to help them find what was relevant to them. In 2004 he was introduced to Hopkins, who had written a piece of software to manage his extensive music collection. The software learned tastes and preferences and utilised artificial intelligence to generate playlists and recommendations. With investment from the founders and from venture capital firm Eden Ventures, they launched Exabre in 2004, and promoted The Filter as a site providing music and movie recommendations directly to consumers.

Although the venture was successful, reaching an average of 800,000 unique visitors per month, in 2009 The Filter modified its business model to licensing the recommendation engine to other businesses. To date, this strategy has proved successful, and the company has secured large contracts, particularly in the US.

Executives and Board of Directors
Peter Gabriel has been involved in various media, music and technology businesses since 1987, when he founded the Real World Group, comprising  Real World Studios, Real World Records, and later Real World Multi Media and Real World Films. In 2000, he was co-founder and board member of OD2 (On Demand Distribution), which became the leading European platform provider for the distribution of online music (acquired in 2004 by Loudeye of Seattle, Washington). In 2005, he acquired Solid State Logic with David Engelke. Gabriel remains an advisor and investor at The Filter.

Clients

Since 2009, The Filter has secured contracts tailoring its relevance platform for a number of digital content providers such as Nokia, Dailymotion, BT TV, NBC.com, Warner Brothers, Vudu,  we7 and Sony Music. In 2014 The Filter began offering its personalisation services to online retailers, securing its first contracts with Maplin Electronics and Liberty of London.

Awards
In January 2015, AUPEO Personal Radio was named as a CES Innovation Awards Honoree. The service uses The Filter's technology to provide feed and metadata aggregation as well as radio station personalisation.

In May 2011 Music Week Magazine nominated the Nokia Gig Finder app (developed by Ovi) as a finalist for its Mobile Music App of the year award. This app utilises The Filter's technology to learn music tastes and recommend the best and most relevant live events happening near the user. In 2009 The Filter was selected by the UKTI (UK Trade & Investment) for its Digital Mission to SXSW in Austin, Texas.

The Filter was a recipient of the Red Herring 100 Europe 2008 - awarded to the best European tech start-ups, and were also selected to partake in Webmission08. Webmission is a UK initiative backed by Techcrunch, Bebo, Sun Microsystems and Oracle Corporation (among others) that aims to bring the 20 most innovative tech companies that are "ready to do business in the US or potentially attract a US investor." The Filter was also chosen as one of six finalists from over 600 entries in the Popkomm Innovation in Music Awards in October 2008.

References

External links
 The Filter official website

British entertainment websites
Companies based in Bath, Somerset
Companies established in 2006
Recommender systems